The Uttarakhand State Football Association (USFA) is the governing body of football activities in the Indian state of Uttarakhand and the Uttarakhand football team. It is affiliated with the All India Football Federation.

See also
Uttarakhand football team
Uttarakhand Super League
All India Football Federation
List of Indian state football associations
Football in India
Cricket Association of Uttarakhand

References

External links

Page at the All India Football Federation website.

Sports governing bodies in India
Football governing bodies in India
Sports organizations established in 2000
Organisations based in Uttarakhand
Football in Uttarakhand
2000 establishments in Uttarakhand